Daniel Alejandro Hernández González (born 10 December 1990) is a Colombian footballer who most recently played for Al-Shorta in the Iraqi Premier League as a midfielder.

References

External links

1990 births
Living people
Footballers from Medellín
Colombian footballers
Association football midfielders
Categoría Primera A players
Categoría Primera B players
UAE Pro League players
Campeonato Brasileiro Série A players
Argentine Primera División players
Leones F.C. footballers
Cortuluá footballers
Once Caldas footballers
Baniyas Club players
Independiente Medellín footballers
Águilas Doradas Rionegro players
Club Athletico Paranaense players
San Lorenzo de Almagro footballers
Club Atlético Huracán footballers
Deportivo Pasto footballers
Al-Shorta SC players
Colombian expatriate footballers
Colombian expatriate sportspeople in Brazil
Colombian expatriate sportspeople in Argentina
Expatriate footballers in Brazil
Expatriate footballers in Argentina